

Events

Births
 Eifuku-mon In (died 1342), Japanese poet of the Kamakura period and member of the Kyōgoku school of verse
 Awhadi of Maragheh (died 1338), Persian

Deaths

13th-century poetry
Poetry